The AN/PRC-117 translates to "Army/Navy, Portable, Radio, Communication". It is a man-portable, tactical software-defined combat-net radio, manufactured by Harris Corporation, in two different versions:

 AN/PRC-117F Falcon II MBMMR (Multiband Multimission Manpack Radio), also referred to as AN/PRC-117F-MP, covering the 30-512 MHz frequency range, provided without an internal GPS (optionally an external commercial GPS can be connected, or a GPS SAASM as a PLGR (Precision Lightweight GPS Receiver) or a DAGR (Defense Advanced GPS Receiver);
 AN/PRC-117G Falcon III MNMR (Multiband Networking Manpack Radio), also referred to as AN/PRC-117G-MP, covering the 30-2000 MHz frequency range, and provided with internal SAASM GPS (optionally an external commercial GPS can be connected).

Both radios have NSA certification for the transmission of voice and data traffic up to the Top Secret level.

The designation AN/PRC signifies "Army Navy / Portable Radio Communications" and is based on the Joint Electronics Type Designation System guidelines. The radios are also provided in a vehicular configuration under the AN/VRC-103 nomenclature.

Users

The AN/PRC-117F/G radio is currently in use with the United States Navy Seabee and EOD teams in their MRAP and JERRV vehicles. 
The radio is also in use by the United States Marine Corps, United States Army, USSOCOM, United States Coast Guard, United States Air Force, Royal Air Force, Dutch Army, Spanish Air Force, British Army, Norwegian Armed Forces, Danish Army, Croatian Army Canadian Forces in Afghanistan and German Armed Forces.

The radio is part of an Over-the-horizon Satellite Communications and Improved Dual Command and Control Console system recognized by the US Army as a Top 10 Invention in 2005.

The radio has also been embedded in remote mine hunting systems for the US Navy.

Specifications

General
Frequency Range: 30 MHz to 2 GHz
Presets: 100 (110 including DAMA)
Transmission Modes: FM, AM, PSK, CPM
Tuning Resolution: 10 Hz
 Model: RT-1796 (P)(C)/U

Transmitter
Output Power: 1 W to 20 W
Harmonic Suppression: –40 dBc
Frequency Stability: +/- 1.0 ppm

Receiver
FM Sensitivity -118 dBm (10 dB SINAD)
Adjacent Channel Rejection 60 dB

Interoperability
Fill devices: AN/CYZ-10 DTD, AN/PYQ-10 SKL (Supports DS-101, DS-102 and Mode 2/3)
Crypto Modes KY-57, ANDVT/KYV-5, KG-84C, FASCINATOR
Radios 
AN/PRC-152
AN/PRC-148
AN/PRC-119A/B/G
AN/PRC-113
AN/PRC-77
AN/PSC-5
Other versions of the AN/PRC-117

Interfaces
External Data: RS-232, MIL-STD-188-114A
Remote control: RS-232, RS-422
Antenna ports: Separate VHF, VHF-HI/UHF
Audio: Six-pin Standard
Power: Two BA-5590, BB-390A/U, BB-2590, or BB-590 batteries

Physical Dimensions
AN/PRC-117G
3.7H x 7.4W x 8.8D in. (w/o battery case)
Weight 8.2 lbs (without batteries)
12 lbs with batteries

Environmental
Temperature: -40 °C to 70 °C
Immersion: 1 Meter
Test Method: MIL-STD-810E
Finish: CARC Green

Key Features
Removable keypad display unit
Full numeric keypad
NVG compatible display
External GPS - DAGR, PLGR, and  NMEA 0183 compatible
MELP

Waveforms

Line of Sight
VHF/UHF AM/FM
SINCGARS ECCM
HAVE QUICK II ECCM
ANW2 - Advanced Networking Wideband Waveform (Harris)
SRW Soldier Radio Waveform 
NATO SATURN waveform, per NATO STANAG 4372 - optional

SATCOM
MIL-STD-188-181-B/C 
MIL-STD-188-182-A
MIL-STD-188-183-A/B
Integrated Waveform (IW) 
High performance waveform (HPW) optional
Mobile User Objective System (MUOS) - optional

See also
AN/PRC-152
AN/PRC-150
AN/PRC-148
AN/PRC-119
AN/PRC-113

References

External links
 

Military radio systems of the United States
Military electronics of the United States
Military equipment introduced in the 2000s
Communication Systems of Bundeswehr